Jessy Hendrikx (born 25 January 2002) is a Dutch professional footballer who plays as a forward for Belgian club Esperanza Pelt.

Career
Born in Blerick, Limburg, Hendrikx started playing football for HBSV before joining the VVV-Venlo academy. He was promoted to the first team in June 2020. In November 2020, before making his professional debut for VVV, he was sent on loan to Helmond Sport for the remained of the 2020–21 season. He made his debut on 4 December 2020 in a 2–0 loss to Go Ahead Eagles in the Eerste Divisie, coming on for Gaétan Bosiers in the 72nd minute.

Ahead of the 2021–22 season, Hendrikx signed a permanent contract with Helmond Sport.

In June 2022, Hendrikx signed with the fifth-tier Belgian Division 3 club Esperanza Pelt.

Career statistics

References

2002 births
Living people
Footballers from Venlo
Dutch footballers
Association football forwards
VVV-Venlo players
Helmond Sport players
Eerste Divisie players
Dutch expatriate footballers
Expatriate footballers in Belgium
Dutch expatriate sportspeople in Belgium